The Algoa Bay Yacht Club (ABYC) is a yacht club in Port Elizabeth, Eastern Cape, South Africa. Port Elizabeth forms part of the Nelson Mandela Bay Metropolitan Municipality.

History

The Algoa Bay Yacht Club was established on 14 September 1959 and currently has around 245 members. The ABYC Founder Members were Paddy Goodall, Scotty Pearson, Mike Morgan, Harold Kohler, Charles Allen, Graham Packer, Jerry Cullum and Stompie Macdonald. ABYC incorporates the Zwartkops Yacht Club which was previously named the Beaconsfield Yacht Club and established in 1884 on the Zwartkops River.

The cross on the ABYC pennant commemorates the wooden cross erected in Algoa Bay by the first sailor from Europe to discover it, Bartolomeu Dias, on 12 March 1488. The Dias Cross Memorial now commemorates this event.

Activities

Regattas

ABYC hosts local, regional, national and international sailing regattas.

Hosted regattas

 1958: In 1958 the Lipton Cup Regatta was hosted by Algoa Bay Yacht Club. After winning the Lipton Cup in Cape Town in 1957 in Trickson II, the skipper Harold Kohler (sailing under the burgee of Redhouse Yacht Club) nominated Algoa Bay as the defence's sailing area. The 1958 Lipton Cup regatta was won by Wilf Hancock from Durban.
 1962: In 1962 the Lipton Cup fleet returned to Algoa Bay as a result of the nomination of ABYC by Noel Horsfield, the winner of the 1961 Lipton Cup, a fleet of 30 Sq’s competed for the Lipton Cup and for the first time ABYC had an entry – Paddy Goodall’s “Sunmaid”. Harold Kohler was in there again with “Trickson II” under the Redhouse burgee while Graham Packer represented Zwartkops. None of these three local entries managed to win the event and the competition was not held in Algoa Bay waters again until 1998.
 1972: In 1972 the RCOD and Soling classes held their National Championships on the bay with ABYC hosting the event.
 1975: During 1975 ABYC's annual regatta “Algoa Bay Week” was established - a regatta that has been held every year since then. The first one was prefaced by a boat show held at the swimming bath at St.George’s Park. A small yacht was launched into the swimming bath itself for inspection by the public, various displays of yachting equipment were laid out and entertainment was provided by the Grey High School band. The NSRI together with the South African Air Force performed a rescue operation. An inflatable dinghy floated in the swimming pool and from it a patient was air lifted into a helicopter. First major sponsor was Kronenbrau, then Opel, then Kwikot, then Continental 1995 to 2000, then GMSA and Nelson Mandela Bay Municipality 2002 to 2005.
 1998: The Lipton Cup was held in Algoa Bay in 1998.
 1998: Dart Nationals
 1999: ABYC hosted the J22 World Championships in 1999.
 2002: Optimist Selections
 2003: The Optimist African Continental Championships were held at ABYC in 2003.
 2005: Optimist Selections
 2005 Finn Nationals
 2006: Hobie 16 World Championships 
 2007: The Mirror World Championships were hosted by ABYC in January 2007 and resulted in a number of firsts: First Duo to win the pre-worlds  and World Championships and the first all female skipper and crew to win the World Championships. The President of the International Mirror Class Association, Patrick Blaney, said; “In my years involved, I have been to many great clubs, seen some great racing and participated in some fantastic events, ABYC has now joined that elite group with perhaps the best combination of location, sailing (wind and water) and club spirit that I have ever witnessed.” 
 2012: The Hobie 16 Nationals took place in Algoa Bay in 2012, 2013, 2014 
 2015: The Vasco Da Gama Ocean Race from Durban to Port Elizabeth finished at ABYC in 2015, 2016, 2017  
 2015: The 60th SAP 5O5 World Championships were hosted by ABYC from 23 March to 3 April 2015.

Annual regattas

 ABYC hosts a number of local short and medium distances races and short course regattas throughout the sailing season
 Algoa Bay Sailing Week is the annual premier provincial yacht regatta.
 The ABYC Inter-club Dinghy Regatta is held at either North End Lake  or off-shore.
 A number of radio-controlled yacht regattas are held annually.

Community and development

 The first sail training school for locals with an emphasis on youth was established in 1998 
 In 2001, with the demise of the Zwartkops Yacht Club, ABYC expanded their facilities and installed a slipway to accommodate the dinghy sailing population.
 In 2003 a need was seen to embark on sail training with an emphasis on previously disadvantaged youth and the ABYC Sailing School was established. A 4-year partnership with LoveLife South Africa was established in 2003 which resulted in close on One Thousand school pupils taking part in an eight-week sail training programme under the tutelage of LoveLife coaches.
 ABYC members give support to other watersport events in Algoa Bay such as the annual Bell Buoy Challenge 
 ABYC runs a Sailing School teaching children and adults sailing.  It runs across the sailing season of September to May, over weekends, by volunteer coaches.  ABYC owns a fleet of dinghies: O-9ers, Optimists, Lasers, a Sprog, and a Regatta.  Advanced learners are able to sail and compete on keelboats, including the Club's L26, and a loaned J22, J-Sea. Dinghy sailors are competing in local, provincial, national and international events on Mirrors, Hobie-Cats, RS Teras, Lasers and 420s.
 ABYC members give support to other watersport events or organisations in Algoa Bay, such as Redhouse Yacht Club and arranging  provincial or national regattas.

Notable ABYC sailors
 Bertie Reed – Springbok sailor.
 Jimmy Swinnerton on Flame  
 John Tudehope, Sean Wiseman, Alan Straton - Vasco Da Gama Ocean Race 2014, 2015 on Wallbanger a Simonis 35
 Tony and Sigi Bailes, Mark Dawson - Vasco Da Gama Ocean Race 2014, 2015 on Nemesis a Fast 42
 Tammy Bailes and Luke Weddell - 2016 RS Tera World Championships

External links
 Official website of Algoa Bay Yacht Club

References

Yacht clubs in South Africa
Sailing in South Africa